Derrick Rostagno was the defending champion but lost in the semifinals to Goran Ivanišević.

Petr Korda won in the final 6–4, 6–2 against Ivanišević.

Seeds
A champion seed is indicated in bold text while text in italics indicates the round in which that seed was eliminated. The top eight seeds received a bye to the second round.

Draw

Finals

Top half

Section 1

Section 2

Bottom half

Section 3

Section 4

References

External links
 ITF tournament edition details

Singles